The Jhalak Prize for Book of the Year by a Writer of Colour is an annual literary prize awarded to British or British-resident BAME writers. £1,000 is awarded to the sole winner. The Jhalak Prize launched in 2016 and was created by writers Sunny Singh, Nikesh Shukla, and Media Diversified. It is supported by The Authors’ Club and an anonymous donor, and is the second literary prize in the UK to only accept entries by writers of colour, following the SI Leeds Literary Prize for BAME women writers, which was first awarded in 2012. In 2016, the Equality and Human Rights Commission praised: "this award is the type of action which the Commission supports and recommends."

Winners

References

External links 
 Official website

Awards established in 2017
British literary awards